The 1984 AFC Asian Cup was the 8th edition of the men's AFC Asian Cup, a quadrennial international football tournament organised by the Asian Football Confederation (AFC). The finals were hosted by Singapore between 1 December and 16 December 1984. The field of ten teams was split into two groups of five. Saudi Arabia won their first title, beating China in the final 2–0.

Qualification

21 teams competed in qualifying for the 1984 AFC Asian Cup with the teams being separated into three groups of five teams and one group of six. The top two of each group would qualify through to the Asian Cup as they would join Singapore and Kuwait who automatically qualified. At the end of the qualifying, the remaining eight teams was filled in which included Saudi Arabia as they made their finals debut.

Venue

Squads

Group stage
All times are Singapore Standard Time (UTC+8)

Group A

Group B

Knockout stage

Semi-finals

Third place play-off

Final

Awards

Winners

Individual Awards

Goalscorers

With three goals, Jia Xiuquan, Shahrokh Bayani and Nasser Mohammadkhani are the top scorers in the tournament. In total, 44 goals were scored by 34 different players, with four of them credited as own goals.

3 goals

 Jia Xiuquan
 Shahrokh Bayani
 Nasser Mohammadkhani

2 goals

 Gu Guangming
 Zhao Dayu
 Majed Abdullah
 Razali Saad

1 goal

 Li Huayun
 Lin Lefeng
 Yang Zhaohui
 Zuo Shusheng
 Hamid Alidousti
 Zia Arabshahi
 Abdullah Al-Buloushi
 Faisal Al-Dakhil
 Muayad Al-Haddad
 Ibrahim Khalfan
 Khalid Salman
 Ali Zaid
 Mohammed Abduljawad
 Mohaisen Al-Jam'an
 Shaye Al-Nafisah
 Saleh Khalifa
 Malik Awab
 Lee Tae-ho
 Walid Abu Al-Sel
 Radwan Al-Sheikh Hassan
 Farooq Abdulrahman
 Adnan Al-Talyani
 Fahad Khamees

Own goals
 Shahin Bayani (playing against Saudi Arabia)
 Ibrahim Al-Rumaihi (playing against for Kuwait)
 Mubarak Anber (playing against Syria)
 Issam Mahrous (playing against Kuwait)

Final positions

References

External links
Details at RSSSF
The Awards

 
AFC
AFC
AFC Asian Cup tournaments
International association football competitions hosted by Singapore
December 1984 sports events in Asia